A swing bridge is a movable bridge that swivels to bring a road or other crossingway into place.

Swing Bridge may also refer to:

Swing Bridge (Belize), in Belize City
Swing Bridge (Keeseville, New York), listed on the US NRHP
Swing Bridge, River Tyne, UK
Simple suspension bridge, also called a "swing bridge" (in New Zealand)

See also
Swinging Bridge (disambiguation)